The Department of Home Affairs was an Australian government department that existed between 1928 and 1932. It was the second so-named Australian Government department.

Scope
Information about the department's functions and/or government funding allocation could be found in the Administrative Arrangements Orders, the annual Portfolio Budget Statements and in the department's annual reports.

At its creation, the department dealt with:
Actuarial matters
Aliens' registration (new matter, as the Aliens' Registration Act 1920 had not appeared before its suspension by Act of 1926)    
Astronomy 
Australian War Memorial
Census and Statistics
Commonwealth Literary Fund
Elections
Emigration from Australia of children and aboriginal natives
Forestry
Franchise
Immigration restrictions
Indentured coloured labour
Meteorology
Naturalisation
North Australia and Central Australia
Northern Territory
Oil investigation
Oil prospecting (encouragement of)
Passports
Pearl shelling and Trepang fisheries in Australian waters beyond territorial limits
People of races (other than the Aboriginal races in any State) for whom it is deemed necessary to make special laws
Prisoners from territories
Prospecting for precious metals (assistance for)
Seat of Government
Solar Observatory.

Structure
The department was a Commonwealth Public Service department, staffed by officials who were responsible to the Minister for Home Affairs.

References

Home Affairs
Ministries established in 1928